The 2004 Kazakhstan Premier League was the 13th season of the Kazakhstan Premier League, the highest football league competition in Kazakhstan, and took place between 3 April and 2 November.

Teams
For the 2004 season, the league was expanded to 19 teams from 17. This meant that Almaty and FC Yassi were promoted to the Premier League, and no teams were relegated the previous season.

Before the start of the season Yelimay were renamed Semey, Batys became Akzhayik, Esil Kokshetau became Okzhetpes and promoted teams Tsesna and Yassi became Alma-Ata and  Yassi Sairam.

Only Kairat obtained a UEFA license for the 2005/2006 season.

Team overview

League table

Results

Season statistics

Top scorers

References

Kazakhstan Premier League seasons
1
Kazakh
Kazakh